Wates Group Ltd is one of the largest family owned construction, property services and development companies in the United Kingdom.

Wates Giving, the firm's charitable foundation, has donated over £10 million since 2008.

History

Edward Wates established his eponymous business in 1897 as a Streatham housebuilder. In the 1920s and 1930s it expanded into speculative residential schemes and general contracting; moving to London Road, Mitcham and then Norbury.

Up to the outbreak of World War II, Wates was building about 2,000 dwellings per annum. In the run up to hostilities it took on substantial military contracts, and applied precast concrete construction to Mulberry harbours; barges; air raid shelters, and trench linings. Post war, the firm applied the same techniques to, high and low rise, system built housing, completing over 60,000 units.

Wates purchased property maintenance businesses Linbrook Services Ltd and the Purchase Group Ltd, in 2011 and 2014, for £40.8 and £13.6 million respectively.

In 2015, Wates acquired the construction; facility management, and engineering services businesses of Shepherd Building Group for £9.8 million. Twelve hundred staff transferred to Wates in September 2015.

Three hundred redundancies were announced in May 2020. Wates blamed this loss of 8% of its workforce on consequences of the COVID-19 Pandemic then in July 2020, announced a focus on public sector and housing contracts.

Projects
Notable past projects include:

 RAF Keevil, 1941
 Housing for Dulwich Estate, 1972
 Doncaster Civic Hall, 2012 (CIOB Project of the Year)
 Victoria and Albert Museum extension, 2017

Controversies

Carbon monoxide

In 2017, Wates Group was fined £640,000 plus £21,000 costs following a breach of  the Health and Safety at Work etc. Act 1974. The firm and its subcontractor had inadequately planned replacement of boiler cowls on a 13 storey block of flats. The mistake resulted in a live flue being blocked and carbon monoxide entering dwellings.

Glass fatality

A banksman was fatally crushed at Wates' 20 Eastbourne Mews site during June 2015 when a glass walling unit fell on him. Westminster Coroner's Court was critical of deficiencies in the lifting plans and method statements in use.

Site delays

In 2013, an Adjudicator determined Wates should pay a brickwork subcontractor compensation for delays at a site in Tower Hamlets. Wates did not accept the decision but High Court Judge Edwards-Stuart ordered it to pay £283,467 plus interest. Judgement confirmed the Adjudicator acted within their jurisdiction and there had been no remaining dispute between the parties on the sum due.

Fatal fall

In September 2004, Wates Construction entered a guilty plea to  a charge of breaching Section 3(1) of the Health and Safety at Work etc. Act 1974 and was fined £150,000 plus £14,769 costs. A subcontractor fell through a skylight at the Royal Artillery Museum, landing 11 metres below, on a concrete floor. The victim died of his injuries four days later. Before the June 2000 incident, Wates had agreed with subcontractors that more protection was required around the skylight but did not suspend construction.

Salisbury roof

In 1997, Wates built a retail warehouse in Salisbury for Waitrose under a design–build contract. The defective roof collapsed in 2002; claims were made against Wates, and they in turn issued proceedings against their subcontract designer. It emerged Wates had deviated from the original drawings and allegations against inadequate design, were in fact allegations concerned with workmanship. Wates agreed to pay costs to the designer, but only on a standard, not the potentially more expensive indemnity basis. Judge Coulson found Wates should have realised their action against the designer had no merit and abandoned them sooner. Wates was ordered to pay costs on an indemnity basis for that latter part of the case.

Domain name disputes

In October 2015, Wate recovered registration of domain name wates-construction.co.uk from Nominet. It had been abusively registered by a third party. In December 2018, Wates recovered registration of domain name watesconstruction.co.uk from Nominet. It had also been abusively registered by a third party.

Political donations

Wates has been a major donor to the UK Conservative Party. From 2007 to 2017, Wates Group Services Ltd gave £430,000 to the party, including a £50,000 donation in February 2017.

Awards
 Construction News Contractor of the Year Award 2017.
 Building Major Contractor of the Year Award 2009, 2010 and 2016.

References

External links
 Wates Group website

Construction and civil engineering companies established in 1897
Construction and civil engineering companies of England
1897 establishments in England
British companies established in 1897